Ronnie Luke Leitch (19 October 1953 – 1 October 2018 as රොනී ලීච්), better known as Ronni Leitch and Thattaya, was a Sri Lankan actor, comedian, singer, presenter and a social activist. Largely popularized as a comedian, Leitch was a  singer, having gained fame for singing over 350 songs. His most notable songs include "Thattaya" and "Kauda Bole Alice".

Family
Leitch was born on 19 October 1953 in Dehiwela. His father died on 26 December 2017 and funeral took place on 27 December at 4:00 p.m at the Mount Lavinia Cemetery.

He married his childhood sweetheart, Yvette in 1986, and is the father of daughter Keshia and son Keshan. Leitch met Yvette first in 1974 in Bellanvila, when their homes were situated in close proximity to each other. They married on 7 June 1986. Their first child, Keshia was born on 17 September 1989. Keshia married on 8 June 2017. Keshia is a past pupil of Bishop's College, Colombo and Keshan is an old boy of S. Thomas' College, Mount Lavinia.

Career
Since the age of 8 years old, Leitch made his foray into the entertainment industry by participating in an All Island Talent Contest. Leitch also worked in the Defense Ministry for six years at the time of his daughter's birth.

Before entering acting, Leitch performed as a singer in many outdoor and indoor musical shows. He engaged with many musical bands in early 1980s, such as Pioneers, Haze, Super Golden Chimes and Super Stars. He had his first overseas tour in 1986 with the band Super Stars. In 1989, he rose to prominence by singing his most famous solo, Thattaya. He performed the song by invitation of The Gypsies band leaders Sunil Perera and Piyal Perera. With the huge popularity of the song, he decided to bald his head.

Leitch performed in many duets with Corrine Almeida and Mariazelle Gunathilake, which became popular hits such as Atha Mita Kasi Panam.

Apart from acting and singing, Leitch entered television hosting with the children's program Poddange Weda which was telecasted by Sirasa TV in 2016.

Leitch was an active social activist where he was involved in charity work and donations all across the country. On 7 August 2010, he performed a musical night A Roaring Evening with Ronnie Leitch organized by The Lions Club of Athurugiriya Millennium City to raise the funds for financing community service projects.

Leitch helped the Old Thomian Swimming Club (OTSC) of S. Thomas' College, Mount Lavinia in all musical "happenings" for consecutive 12 years, and also at Royal-Thomian Big Match in the OTSC Tent with the band Wild Flowers.

Death
Ronnie Leitch died on 1 October 2018 in Perth, whilst on a musical tour of Australia. The cause of the death was revealed as cardiac arrest. His remains were brought to back to Sri Lanka on 10 October and kept at Jayaratne Florists for final rites. The body was finally buried at the Borella Cemetery on 11 October.

Filmography
Starting with Athin Athata in 1973, Leitch performed as a comedian in many films. His most notable films are Re Daniel Dawal Migel and Cheriyo film series. His last film acting came through 2018 film Yama Raja Siri, where he acted as one of the main protagonists.

Discography

Albums

Solo Tracks

References

External links

Rony Leech songs at Sarigama
ඒ සිනහව අද කඳුළකටහැර වූ රොනී

Sri Lankan male film actors
Burgher musicians
1954 births
2018 deaths
Sri Lankan male television actors